Bolham may refer to:

 Bolham, Devon, England
 Bolham, Nottinghamshire, England